Wagas is a Philippine television drama romance anthology broadcast by GMA News TV and GMA Network. It premiered on GMA News TV on February 9, 2013. The show aired its final episode on GMA News TV on May 25, 2019. It moved to GMA Network on September 2, 2019 on the network's morning line up. The series concluded on GMA Network on November 15, 2019, with a total of 55 episodes.

The series is streaming online on YouTube.

Cast and characters

Throwback Pag-Ibig
Lead cast
 Sunshine Dizon as July Aguilar 
 Mike Tan as Ryan Aguilar
 Leanne Bautista as Chloe Liam / Smile Aguilar

Supporting cast
 Regine Angeles as Amor
 Angelica Ulip as Chelsie
 Joel Palencia as Eric
 Lovely Abella as Kristine
 Jason Dewey as Hilton
 Angelina Kanapi as Sara
 Iyah Mina as Mama Ru
 Rob Sy as Mario
 Gigi Locsin as Susing
 Antonette Garcia as Margaux

Wait Lang Is This Love?
Lead cast
Barbie Forteza as Mayumi "Yummy" Bubuyog
Jak Roberto as Eugene Bitao
Kristofer Martin as Cedrick Dacanay

Supporting cast
Yayo Aguila as Glorious "Gloria" Bubuyog
Tina Paner as Sonya Bubuyog
Rey "PJ" Abellana as Rex Dacanay
Ayra Mariano as Bane
Ashley Ortega as Sandy
Jun Sabayton as Andres
 Mico Aytona as Eugene
 Chrome Prince Cosio as Mr. Salazar

Guest cast
 Bianca Umali as Monica
 Migo Adecer as Waldo
 Ana Roces as Rosemary

Episodes

Accolades

References

External links 
 
 

2013 Philippine television series debuts
2019 Philippine television series endings
Filipino-language television shows
GMA Network original programming
GMA Integrated News and Public Affairs shows
GMA News TV original programming
Philippine anthology television series
Television shows set in the Philippines